Garen Bloch (6 September 1978 – 21 July 2018) was a South African former Olympic cyclist.
 
He was born in Johannesburg, South Africa. He is the younger brother of Olympian cyclist Sean Bloch of South Africa. He won 16 South African national titles, and set four national records.  From 1994-96, he was Maccabi Sportsman of the Year. He came in third at the 1997 World Cup in the points race, and second in the 1999 UCI Track Cycling World Cup Classics.

Bloch competed for Team South Africa in the 2000 Summer Olympics at the age of 22 in Sydney in Cycling; Men's 1,000 metres Time Trial, and finished in 8th with a time of 1:04.478.

References

1978 births
2018 deaths
Olympic cyclists of South Africa
South African male cyclists
Cyclists at the 2000 Summer Olympics
South African Jews
Sportspeople from Johannesburg
Motorcycle road incident deaths
Road incident deaths in South Africa